Sir Alan Graham Dawtry  (8 April 1915 – 27 January 2018) was a British municipal government official. He was an Assistant solicitor at Sheffield City Council between 1938 and 1948, deputy town clerk at Bolton, England between 1948-1952 and Leicester, England between 1952-1954 and town clerk Wolverhampton, England, 1954–1956. He was Chief Executive of the Westminster City Council between 1956 and 1977. During his career, he was also Town Clerk for the City of Westminster. In the 1974 New Year Honours, Dawtry was knighted.

Early life and education 

Dawtry was born in Sheffield; his parents were Melancthon and Kate Dawtry. After King Edward VII School, he studied law at Sheffield University, graduating in 1937.

References

Further reading 
 

1915 births
2018 deaths
Commanders of the Order of the British Empire
Knights Bachelor
English solicitors
English centenarians
Men centenarians
20th-century English lawyers
20th-century English businesspeople
Businesspeople from Sheffield
Alumni of the University of Sheffield
People educated at King Edward VII School, Sheffield